BetterHelp is a mental health platform that provides online mental health services directly to consumers. The online counseling and therapy services are provided through web-based interaction as well as phone and text communication. BetterHelp was founded in 2013 by Alon Matas and Danny Bragonier, and acquired by Teladoc, Inc. in 2015. BetterHelp maintained its brand name post acquisition and continues to provide online counseling services to consumers.

History 
BetterHelp was founded by Alon Matas in 2013, after he faced personal challenges finding professional counseling services that accommodated his schedule. With the mission of helping all those facing similar challenges in gaining access to professional counseling, Matas partnered with co-founder Danny Bragonier to develop BetterHelp's web-based counseling portal and therapist directory.  Revenue had reached a projected $60 million by 2018.

Services 

BetterHelp is a web-based platform that allows patients to interact with counselors and therapists via a private online message board, live chat, phone and video conferencing and is the world's largest counseling service. The "room" is open 24/7 and can be accessed from any Internet-connected device from any physical location.

Acquisition 

In 2015, BetterHelp was acquired by Teladoc, Inc., a telehealth company that uses telephone and videoconferencing technology to provide on-demand remote therapy. Teladoc acquired BetterHelp for $3.5 million in cash and a $1.0 million promissory note, with an agreement to make annual payments to the sellers equal to 15% of the total net revenue generated by the BetterHelp business for each of the next three years.

Controversy 
In October 2018, BetterHelp gained attention from media personalities after concerns were raised about alleged use of unfair pricing, bad experiences with the app, paid reviews from actors, and terms of service that allegedly did not correspond with ads promoted by professional YouTubers. CEO Alon Matas issued a statement responding to the allegations. YouTube content creators such as PewDiePie and Boogie2988 have spoken out on this issue.

BetterHelp has received backlash for supposedly sharing its customers' personal data with Facebook. In its latest privacy policy update, BetterHelp stated: "We may share your information in connection with an asset sale, merger, bankruptcy, or other business transaction." The company has responded to these complaints by saying that law requires BetterHelp to hold on to health data and that they are not subject to HIPAA guidelines.

On March 2, 2023, the FTC issued a proposed order banning BetterHelp from sharing consumers' health data with 3rd parties. The order also requires BetterHelp to pay $7.8 million to consumers to settle allegations of revealing consumers' sensitive data with Facebook, Snapchat, and others. The FTC complaint tied to the proposed order alleges that BetterHelp collected health status and histories, IP addresses, and email addresses from consumers while making repeated promises to keep this information private. "From 2013 to December 2020, however, [BetterHelp] continually broke these privacy promises, monetizing consumers’ health information to target them and others with advertisements for the Service," the complaint summarizes.

See also 
 Talkspace
 Telepsychiatry

References 

Internet properties established in 2013
2013 establishments in California
2015 mergers and acquisitions
Behavior therapy
Telehealth
Internet culture
Internet-related controversies